In number theory, Mazur's control theorem, introduced by ,  describes the behavior in Zp extensions of the Selmer group of an abelian variety over a number field.

References

Theorems in algebraic number theory